This is a list of the songs that reached number one in Mexico in 1974, according to Núcleo Radio Mil as published in the Billboard and Notitas Musicales magazines. Also included are the number-one songs according to the Record World magazine.

Chart history (Billboard)

By country of origin
Number-one artists:

Number-one compositions (it denotes the country of origin of the song's composer[s]; in case the song is a cover of another one, the name of the original composition is provided in parentheses):

Chart history (Record World)

See also
1974 in music

References

Sources
Print editions of the Billboard and Record World magazines.

1974 in Mexico
Mexico
Lists of number-one songs in Mexico